The 1912 United States presidential election in Illinois took place on November 5, 1912, as part of the 1912 United States presidential election. State voters chose 29 representatives, or electors, to the Electoral College, who voted for president and vice president.

Illinois was won by New Jersey Governor Woodrow Wilson (D–New Jersey), running with Indiana governor Thomas R. Marshall, with 35.34% of the popular vote, against the 26th president of the United States Theodore Roosevelt (P–New York), running with California governor Hiram Johnson, with 33.72% of the popular vote, the 27th president of the United States William Howard Taft (R–Ohio), running with Columbia University President Nicholas Murray Butler, with 22.13% of the popular vote and the five-time candidate of the Socialist Party of America for President of the United States Eugene V. Debs (S–Indiana), running with the first Socialist mayor of a major city in the United States Emil Seidel, with 7.09% of the popular vote. , this is the last election in which Lee County, Ogle County and Edwards County did not support the Republican nominee.

Election information
The primary and general elections coincided with those for House as well as those for state offices.

Turnout
The total vote in the state-run primary elections (Democratic, Republican) was 731,100.

The total vote in the general election was 1,146,173.

Primaries
Both major parties held non-binding state-run preferential primaries on April 9.

Democratic

The 1912 Illinois Democratic presidential primary was held on April 9, 1912 in the U.S. state of Illinois as one of the Democratic Party's state primaries ahead of the 1912 presidential election.

The vote was a non-binding "beauty contest".

Republican

The 1912 Illinois Republican presidential primary was held on April 9, 1912 in the U.S. state of Illinois as one of the Republican Party's state primaries ahead of the 1912 presidential election.

The vote was a non-binding "beauty contest".

General election

Results

Results by county

See also
 United States presidential elections in Illinois

Notes

References

Illinois
1912
1912 Illinois elections